Marshall Brickman (born August 25, 1939) is an American screenwriter and director, best known for his collaborations with Woody Allen. He is the co-recipient of the 1977 Academy Award for Best Original Screenplay for Annie Hall. He is also known for playing the banjo with Eric Weissberg in the 1960s, and for a series of comical parodies published in The New Yorker.

Life and career
Brickman was born in Rio de Janeiro, Brazil, to American parents Pauline (née Wolin) and Abram Brickman. His family was Jewish. After attending the University of Wisconsin–Madison, he became a member of Folk act The Tarriers in 1962, recruited by former classmate Eric Weissberg. Following the disbanding of The Tarriers in 1965, Brickman joined The New Journeymen with John Phillips and Michelle Phillips, who later had success with The Mamas & the Papas. He left The New Journeymen to pursue a career as a writer, initially writing for television in the 1960s, including Candid Camera, The Tonight Show, and The Dick Cavett Show. It was during this time that he met Allen, with whom he would collaborate on three completed film screenplays during the 1970s: Sleeper (1973), Annie Hall (1977, which won the Best Original Screenplay Oscar), and Manhattan (1979).

Brickman directed several of his own scripts in the 1980s, including Simon, Lovesick, and The Manhattan Project, as well as Sister Mary Explains It All, a TV adaptation of the play by Christopher Durang.  His script with Allen for Manhattan Murder Mystery (1993) had been put aside some years earlier when the project was later revived.

With partner Rick Elice, he wrote the book for the Broadway musical Jersey Boys, about 1960s rock 'n' roll group The Four Seasons. The two collaborated again in 2009 to write the book for the musical The Addams Family.

Brickman's "Who's Who in the Cast," a parody of a Playbill cast list, was published in the July 26, 1976, issue of The New Yorker, and drew so much attention that it was republished in the special theatre issue of May 31, 1993.  Other pieces for The New Yorker include "The Recipes of Chairman Mao" (August 27, 1973) and "The New York Review of Gossip" (May 19, 1975).

Film writer
 Sleeper (1973)
 Ann in Blue (1974) (TV movie)
 The Muppet Show: Sex and Violence (1975)
 Annie Hall (1977)
 Manhattan (1979)
 Simon (1980)
 Lovesick (1983)
 The Manhattan Project (1986)
 For the Boys (1991)
 Manhattan Murder Mystery (1993)
 Intersection (1994)
 Jersey Boys (2014)

Theatre

References

External links
 
 
 
 

1939 births
People from Rio de Janeiro (city)
Brazilian people of American descent
American film directors
American male screenwriters
Best Screenplay BAFTA Award winners
Best Original Screenplay Academy Award winners
Living people
University of Wisconsin–Madison alumni
Jewish American screenwriters
21st-century American Jews
Hugo Award-winning writers
Brazilian American
American people of Brazilian descent